Firebird 2015 AD is a 1981 Canadian science fiction film directed by David M. Robertson and starring Darren McGavin and Doug McClure.

Plot
In the year 2015, the US government outlaws the distribution of gasoline to the public, reserving it only for the politicians, the Military and law enforcement. While it is implied this is due to a fuel shortage, later dialogue rebuffs this stating that gasoline is in abundance. Civilians are also banned from owning or using any form of motor vehicle, and those that do are referred to as Burners, and it is shown that this is a form of rebellion. Burners are monitored and dealt with harshly by the DVC; The Department of Vehicle Control.

Red, a middle aged Burner drives a 1980 Pontiac Turbo Trans Am. His teenage son Cameron (Robert Wisden) however isn't much of a car enthusiast and always raises the issue of how Red is breaking the law. Meanwhile, another Burner is planning on chauffeuring a senator to a conference where he intends to make civilian use of motor vehicles legal again. But while en route to pick up his passenger, the Burner is intercepted by a DVC squad led by McVain (Doug McClure). His subordinate Dolan, a quiet sociopath, blows the Burner away with a grenade launcher. Shana, another member of McVain's team, is appalled by this act and how McVain constantly overlooks the matter. Red takes Cameron for a ride to try and spark his interest in motor cars. They then meet up with Red's friend Indy; another Burner who drives a Plymouth Barracuda. While he and Red race through the desert to see whose car is faster, Cameron gets acquainted with Indy's frisky daughter Jill, who makes repeated sexual advances on him while showing him how to drive her dune buggy. Red and Indy's race however is cut short when the DVC lay an ambush. But an over-anxious member fires too soon and the two make their getaway. Cameron and Jill head in to a barn to have sex, but are caught by McVain's subordinates who rough up Cameron and assault Jill before making off with her. Cameron limps his way home and tells Red and Indy what happened. They modify their cars for a raid on the DVC's camp site to rescue Jill.

Meanwhile, Shana, appalled at Jill's treatment, frees her and the two escape while the rest of the DVC are run down by the burners. The next day Cameron and Jill decide to chauffeur the senator themselves in the Firebird, while Red gets acquainted with Shana.

Cast

Release
Firebird 2015 AD was distributed in Canada by Roke Distributors and released in Calgary's Bretnwood Corral 3 Drive-In on September 18, 1981.

Reception
From retrospective reviews, Claude Gailard discussed the film in his book on post-apocalyptic films stated that the film was "limp and brainless" and that "even connoisseurs of films so bad they become good wil have a hard time enjoying [it]". A reviewer in  TV Guide declared the film was only for car lovers giving it one of four stars. The reviewer stated that the movie showed a "lack of intelligence and the filmmakers' lack of technical know-how".

References

Sources

External links

1980s science fiction films
English-language Canadian films
Films set in 2015
Films set in the future
Canadian science fiction films
1980s Canadian films
English-language science fiction films